J.E. "Eddie" Guerra is the Sheriff of Hidalgo County, Texas. The Hidalgo County Sheriff's Office (HCSO) is a local law enforcement agency serving the over one million citizens of Hidalgo County, Texas, United States. On April 2, 2014, the Hidalgo County Commissioners Court appointed J.E. "Eddie" Guerra, who was Hidalgo County Precinct 4 Constable at the time, to replace Guadalupe Treviño, who resigned on March 28, 2014, saying both internal and external pressure started building on December 12, 2012, when the Panama Unit scandal broke. On November 4, 2014, Sheriff Eddie Guerra was elected by a majority of voters to the post he had held for seven months and the victory kept him in office until 2016, since former Sheriff Treviño was in the second of a four-year term. In 2016, he was up for re-election to a full term.

On November 8, 2016, Guerra defeated Republican challenger Albert "Al" Perez on with nearly 74 percent of 165,000 ballots cast, according to results published by the Hidalgo County Elections Department, which secures his term up to December 31, 2020. On March 3, 2020, Guerra defeated Frank Guerrero in the Democratic primary election and will face a Republican challenger on the November 2020 general election for the 2021-2024 term.

Early life, education, and career
Guerra was born in McAllen and grew up on the D.V. Guerra Ranch, named after his grandfather. He went through Catholic school and graduated from Edinburg High School in 1980. He holds a Bachelor of Science Degree in Agricultural Education from Texas A&M University.

See also
 Hidalgo County Sheriff's Office (Texas)

References

People from Edinburg, Texas
People from McAllen, Texas
Living people
1962 births
Texas A&M University alumni
Texas sheriffs